Pretrei  may refer to:

Amazona pretrei, a parrot species found in parts of South America.

See also 
 Pretre